Nordhausen may refer to:
Nordhausen (district), a district in Thuringia, Germany
 Nordhausen, Thuringia, a city in the district
Nordhausen station, the railway station in the city
Nordhouse, a commune in Alsace (German: Nordhausen)
Narost, a village in Poland (formerly Nordhausen)
Mittelbau-Dora concentration camp, a Nazi concentration camp located near the city
Mittelwerk, an underground factory during World War II
Nordhausen concentration camp, a subcamp of Mittelbau-Dora
Nordhausen, an album by And One
Jorge Nordhausen, a Mexican politician

See also